Éric Duhaime (born April 15, 1969) is a Canadian conservative columnist, radio host, and politician serving as leader of the Conservative Party of Quebec since April 17, 2021.

Early life and education
Born on April 15, 1969, in Montreal, Duhaime holds a Bachelor of Arts in political science from the Université de Montréal and a Master's degree from École nationale d'administration publique (ÉNAP).

Career 
He writes for the Journal de Montréal and the National Post and is also a blogger. He participated in various blogs such as Les analystes  and also ran a blog on the pages of Journal de Québec (called En droite ligne). He hosted Le retour d'Éric Duhaime on FM93 in Quebec City. He also worked as part of public affairs programs broadcast on Noovo, Télé-Québec and 98,5 FM.

In 2017, he allegedly helped fellow Rebel Media contributor Jack Posobiec translate the leaked emails from the Emmanuel Macron presidential campaign.

He also worked for the Montreal Economic Institute, a free market think tank.

Political career
Duhaime spent more than a decade as a political advisor for different leaders in Ottawa and Quebec City. He was an advisor for Stockwell Day during his leadership of the Canadian Alliance from 2001 to 2004, Mario Dumont from 2003 to 2008 when Dumont was leader of the Action démocratique du Québec and Gilles Duceppe of the Bloc Québécois. He was one of the campaign organizers for Marc Bellemare during his mayorality in Quebec City with Vision Quebec from 2004 to 2006. He made his first run for office in 2003, when he ran for the ADQ in Deux-Montagnes, in which he placed third. In 2010, Duhaime co-founded the Réseau Liberté-Québec and the page Quebec fier (RLQ) along with Joanne Marcotte, Roy Eappen, Gérard Laliberté, Ian Sénéchal and Guillaume Leduc. The RLQ is a movement inspired by the advocating of a revival of conservatism and libertarianism in Quebec. On November 22, 2020, Duhaime announced he would be running in the Conservative Party of Quebec leadership election to succeed Adrien D. Pouliot. He won the election with just under 96% of the vote.

Personal life
Duhaime is openly gay, coming out in his 2017 book La fin de l'homosexualité et le dernier gay.

Electoral record

References

1969 births
Journalists from Montreal
Canadian columnists
Living people
Conservatism in Canada
Right-wing politics in Canada
Quebec political party leaders
Université de Montréal alumni
Writers from Montreal
Canadian male journalists
Canadian LGBT journalists
Canadian gay writers
Canadian LGBT broadcasters
French Quebecers
Gay politicians
21st-century Canadian politicians
21st-century Canadian LGBT people
LGBT conservatism
Canadian LGBT politicians